Terricula violetana is a species of moth of the  family Tortricidae. It is found in Japan (Honshu).

The wingspan is 14–21 mm.

References

	

Moths described in 1964
Archipini